Gilman may refer to:

Places

United States
Gilman Ranch, California
Gilman, Colorado
Gilman, Illinois  
Gilman, Iowa  
Gilman, Minnesota 
Gilman, Montana
Gilman, Vermont 
Gilman, Washington, former name of Issaquah
Gilman, Pierce County, Wisconsin
Gilman, Taylor County, Wisconsin
Gilman Lake, a lake in South Dakota
Gilmanton, New Hampshire
Gilmanton, Buffalo County, Wisconsin
Gilmanton Township, Benton County, Minnesota

Other	
Gilman (Yap), an administrative division of the Federated States of Micronesia
Gilman Street, a street in Central, Hong Kong

Other uses
Gilman (name)
Gilman reagent, any of a group of reagents discovered by Henry Gilman
Gilman Paper Company, former paper producer
Gilman Paper Company collection, photo archive in the Metropolitan Museum of Art
Gilman School, a private boys school in Baltimore, Maryland
924 Gilman Street, a collectively run music venue in Berkeley, California

See also
Gillman (disambiguation)